Edme Étienne Borne Desfourneaux (22 April 1767 in Vézelay – 22 February 1849 in Paris) was a French Army General and Governor of Guadalope.

Life

Desfourneaux was born in Vézelay and joined the French Army of the Kingdom of France as sergeant in 1789 with the Régiment de Conti during the French Revolution. He later rose to the rank of lieutenant colonel in the 48th Infantry Regiment in Saint-Domingue in 1792. From 1798 to 1799 he served as Governor of Guadeloupe.

He was gravely wounded at the action of 19 February 1801. Desfourneaux received many honours for his service including:

 Commander of the Legion of Honour in 1804
 Order of Saint Louis 1814

Politics
In 1811 he became a member of the Corps législatif of the First French Empire and served as Vice-President of the body. He also served as a member of the Chamber of Representatives in 1815 during the Hundred Days.

He briefly returned to command troops during the Bourbon Restoration.

Following the Bourbon Restoration he retired from public life and died in Paris in 1849.

Sources 

1767 births
1849 deaths
People of the Quasi-War
French generals
French Republican military leaders of the French Revolutionary Wars
French commanders of the Napoleonic Wars
People from Yonne
Names inscribed under the Arc de Triomphe